The 2023 K League 2, also known as the Hana 1Q K League 2 for sponsorship reasons, is the 11th season of the second division of professional football in South Korea since its establishment in 2013 as the K League Challenge and the sixth season under its current name, the K League 2. This season will be the last to not feature relegation. Gwangju FC are the defending champions and were promoted to K League 1. The 2023 season will kick off at 1 March 2023.

The 2023 season will have 39 Regular rounds (each team plays 36 matches) in which 13 teams play a triple round robin (Rounds 1–39 (1–36)). Then final 3rd, 4th and 5th place teams will join K League 2 play-offs for promotion and 2nd place team will join in K League 1-2 Promotion-Relegation play-off 1 and the winner of K League 2 promotion play-offs (3rd-4th-5th) will join in K League 1-2 Promotion-Relegation play-off 2. Initially bottom teams are relegated to K3 League, but eventually it won't be applied yet.

Overview
A total of thirteen teams are participating in the 2023 edition of K League 2.

Changes
Gwangju FC (promoted after a one-year absence) and Daejeon Hana Citizen (promoted after a seven-year absence) were promoted from the 2022 K League 2. Gimcheon Sangmu (relegated after one year in the top flight) and Seongnam FC (relegated after four years in the top flight) were relegated to 2023 K League 2.

Cheonan City FC and Chungbuk Cheongju FC, which played in the K3 League, made their professional debuts on the K League 2 in the 2023 season, being the 24th and 25th K League member.

There will be no promotion or relegation between the K League 2 and K3 League this season.

Teams

Stadiums

Foreign players
Restricting the number of foreign players strictly to six per team, including a slot for a player from the Asian Football Confederation countries. Gimcheon Sangmu FC, being a military-owned team, is not allowed to sign any foreign players.  A team could use five foreign players on the field each game, including at least one player from the AFC confederation. 
The name in bold indicates that the player was registered during the mid-season transfer window.

League table

Positions by matchday

Results

Promotion/relegation play-offs
There are two playoffs contested in this stage. The Playoff "1" is played with the two league extremes facing each other (K League 1 second-worst placed team against K League 2 second-best placed team). Meanwhile, the Playoff "2" is played with K League 2 10th facing the Semi-playoffs winner. The winners of both ties earn two spots in the 2024 K League 1.

If scores are tied after regular time in any match of both the Semi-playoffs and playoffs, the higher-placed team will advance to the next phase. However, The same conditions do not apply for the promotion/relegation playoffs, with the match, if tied, requiring extra time. Should it remain tied, the match will go to the penalty shoot-outs.

Semi-playoff

Playoff

Promotion-Relegation Playoff Final Round

Matches

First leg

Second leg

See also
 2022 K League 1
 2023 K League 1

Notes

References

External links
 Official K League website

K League 2 seasons
2
K